Coleophora maritella is a moth of the family Coleophoridae. It is found in Canada, including New Brunswick.

The larvae feed on the seeds of Juncus littoralis. They create a trivalved, tubular silken case.

References

maritella
Moths described in 1941
Moths of North America
Taxa named by James Halliday McDunnough